Bohemia Mountain is a mountain in the Cascade Range of the U.S. state of Oregon, within the Umpqua National Forest. A trail traverses the mountain and leads to the summit. There is a location east of the trail's end where on a clear day one can see Mount Shasta, Mount Hood, and other peaks of the Cascades. Camping is available in the area. An abundance of wildflowers and plants bloom on the mountain from late June to mid-August, which attracts butterflies to the area.

Ghost town
Bohemia City is a ghost town that lies off the trailhead. A few buildings and some mining equipment remain from the original settlement, which consisted of saloons, hotels, and some residences. The area surrounding the mountain was once known as the Bohemia mining district, named after the Czech immigrant James "Bohemia" Johnson, who discovered gold in the area in 1863. A gold mine and the settlement were established in 1866.

Climate
Bohemia Mountain's climate is influenced by its location in the Pacific Northwest and the Cascade Range, as well as its elevation. The mountain has cool winter temperatures (above the  persistent snow line isotherm but still freezing), and summers with warm afternoon highs and cool lows (near ). Because of these summer temperatures, as well as the seasonal lag typical of the Pacific Northwest coastal regions, spring occurs as late as the latter part of June, and temperatures warm enough for plant growth to continue into September.

References

External links
 Mount Bohemia - Oregon Gold More information on the Bohemian Mining District
 On the Trail - Bohemia Mountain Photographs of the trail and mountain
 Set of photos of the Bohemia Mining District from Flickr

Cascade Range
Czech-American culture in Oregon
Mountains of Lane County, Oregon
Mountains of Oregon